Miloš Macourek (2 December 1926, Kroměříž – 30 September 2002, Prague) was a Czech poet, playwright, author and screenwriter.

Biography 
During his career, Macourek worked in various professions. From 1953 to 1960, he was a teacher of the art history; later he worked as a dramaturgist at the Barrandov Film Studios. He created children's books, TV series and film comedies.

Works

Books 
 Živočichopis
 Pohádky
 Mravenečník v početnici
 Ostrov pro šest tisíc budíků
 Světe, div se
 Žofka
 Žofka ředitelkou zoo
 Láska a dělová koule : povídky a bajky
 Člověk by nevěřil svým očím
 Jakub a dvě stě dědečků
 Mach a Šebestová
 Žirafa nebo tulipán?

Film and TV screenplays 
 Kdo chce zabít Jessii?
 Čtyři vraždy stačí, drahoušku
 I Killed Einstein, Gentlemen (Zabil jsem Einsteina, pánové) 1969
 Pane, vy jste vdova!
 Straw Hat (Slaměný klobouk) 1971
 Šest medvědů s Cibulkou
 Arabela
 Létající Čestmír
 Mach, Šebestová a kouzelné sluchátko
 Tři mušketýři
 Kytice (Wild Flowers) (2000)

Comics 
 Muriel a andělé (1969, drawn by Kája Saudek)
 Muriel a oranžová smrt (1969/1970, drawn by Kája Saudek)
 Peruánský deník (1984, drawn by Kája Saudek)

References 

Czech male poets
Czech male dramatists and playwrights
Czech screenwriters
Male screenwriters
1926 births
2002 deaths
People from Kroměříž
20th-century Czech poets
20th-century Czech dramatists and playwrights
20th-century male writers
20th-century screenwriters